Drasteria tenera is a moth of the family Erebidae. It is found in Russia, Kazakhstan, Kyrgyzstan and China (Tibet).

References

Drasteria
Moths described in 1877
Moths of Asia